The 2018–19 Campionato Sammarinese di Calcio was the 34th season since its establishment. It is the highest level in San Marino, in which the country's top 15 amateur football clubs played. The season began on 21 September 2018 and concluded with the play-off final on 25 May 2019. La Fiorita were the defending champions from the previous season.

Participating teams

Because there is no promotion or relegation in the league, the same 15 teams who competed in the league last season competed in the league this season.
 S.P. Cailungo (Borgo Maggiore)
 S.S. Cosmos (Serravalle)
 F.C. Domagnano (Domagnano)
 S.C. Faetano (Faetano)
 F.C. Fiorentino (Fiorentino)
 S.S. Folgore Falciano Calcio (Serravalle)
 A.C. Juvenes/Dogana (Serravalle)
 S.P. La Fiorita (Montegiardino)
 A.C. Libertas (Borgo Maggiore)
 S.S. Murata (San Marino)
 S.S. Pennarossa (Chiesanuova)
 S.S. San Giovanni (Borgo Maggiore)
 S.P. Tre Fiori (Fiorentino)
 S.P. Tre Penne (Serravalle)
 S.S. Virtus (Acquaviva)

Regular season
The 15 clubs were split into two groups; one with eight clubs and another with seven clubs. All teams played once against the teams within their own group. At the end of the regular season, the top four from each group advanced to group 1 of the second stage. All other teams advanced to group 2 of the second stage.

Group A

Group B

Results

Second stage
The fifteen clubs played each other twice within their own group. At the end of the second stage, the first through sixth-placed clubs from group 1 advanced to the final stage. From group 2, the first and second-placed clubs advanced to the final stage.

Group 1

Group 2

Play–off
The winner of the play–off, Juvenes/Dogana, advanced to the final stage.

Results

5th-8th Place

Bracket

Summary

|+Semi-finals

|}

|+7th place

|}

|+5th place

|}

Semifinals

7th place

5th place

Final stage
The eight clubs which advanced from the second stage competed in a knockout format final stage to determine the champion of the league.

Bracket

Summary
The first legs of the quarter finals were played from 25 to 28 April 2019 and the second legs were played from 2 to 5 May 2019. The first legs of the semi finals will be played on 11–12 May 2019 and the second legs will be played on 17–18 May 2019.

|+Quarter finals

|}

|+Semi finals

|}

|+Third place

|}

|+Final

|}

Quarterfinals

La Fiorita won 6–0 on aggregate.

Libertas won 5–0 on aggregate.

Tre Fiori won 3–1 on aggregate.

Tre Penne won 2–1 on aggregate.

Semifinals

La Fiorita won 5–0 on aggregate.

Tre Penne won 3–1 on aggregate.

Final

Tre Penne qualified for 2019–20 Champions League preliminary round and La Fiorita qualified for 2019–20 Europa League first qualifying round.

References

External links
 

Campionato Sammarinese di Calcio
San Marino
1